Jan Michael Sprenger (born 26 November 1982) is a German chess grandmaster and philosopher.

Chess career
Born in 1982, Sprenger earned his international master title in 2001 and his grandmaster title in 2018. He is the No. 55 ranked German player as of March 2023. Sprenger plays in the German Chess Bundesliga for the team of Schachfreunde Berlin and writes regularly on chess-related topics.

Academic career
Sprenger holds a PhD in philosophy from the University of Bonn (2008), specializing in philosophy of science, and worked afterwards at Tilburg University, where he was appointed professor in 2014. In 2017, he became professor of philosophy at the University of Turin.

Publications
2019. Bayesian Philosophy of Science (with Stephan Hartmann). Oxford: Oxford University Press.

References

External links

Personal website

1982 births
Living people
Chess grandmasters
German chess players
Sportspeople from Cologne
Academic staff of Tilburg University
University of Bonn alumni
Academic staff of the University of Turin